The Crab Orchard Series in Poetry Open Competition Awards are relatively large prizes given out each year to poets with unpublished manuscripts. In addition to the cash prizes, two winners get published by a university press.

The Crab Orchard Review, a biannual journal of creative works published by the Department of English of Southern Illinois University, Carbondale, and Southern Illinois University Press organize the competition, which gives out $3,500 to two winners. Winners must be U.S. citizens or permanent residents of the United States.

Prior to 2009, the Crab Orchard Series in Poetry Open Competition Awards awarded a first place and a second place. These winners received different prize amounts, but all winning manuscripts were published by Southern Illinois University Press.

Winners

See also
American poetry
List of poetry awards
List of literary awards
List of years in poetry
List of years in literature

American poetry awards